KVDM (88.1 FM) is a radio station licensed to Hays, Kansas. The station airs a Catholic format and is owned by Divine Mercy Radio, Inc. The station began broadcasting in 2010.

Simulcast
In 2014, Divine Mercy Radio purchased KRTT in Great Bend, Kansas from Florida Public Radio for $62,900, and the station began simulcasting KVDM. KRTT had previously simulcast 101.7 KREJ in Medicine Lodge, Kansas.

In late 2019, Divine Mercy Radio acquired KDJM (101.7 FM) in Salina, which was airing a classic country format, and began broadcasting on that station in May 2020 as KJDM.

In 2020, Divine Mercy Radio acquired the higher-power commercial station KRMR (105.7 FM), which was silent, and began broadcasting over that station, renamed KMDG.

References

External links
KVDM's official website

Catholic radio stations
Radio stations established in 2010
2010 establishments in Kansas
DVK
Catholic Church in Kansas
Hays, Kansas